Thomas Brinkmann (born 5 January 1968 in Duisburg) is a German former field hockey player who competed in the 1988 Summer Olympics.

References

External links
 

1968 births
Living people
German male field hockey players
Olympic field hockey players of West Germany
Field hockey players at the 1988 Summer Olympics
Olympic silver medalists for West Germany
Olympic medalists in field hockey
Sportspeople from Duisburg
Medalists at the 1988 Summer Olympics
1990 Men's Hockey World Cup players